Broadway Gondolier  (1935) is a musical film directed by Lloyd Bacon. The film was released by Warner Bros., and featured Dick Powell, Joan Blondell and Adolphe Menjou.

Plot
Richard "Dick" Purcell (Dick Powell), a taxi driver, aspires to achieve his dream of becoming a singer. After a couple of theatre critics discover him while riding in his cab, one of them recommends him to a radio producer (Grant Mitchell). The producer's secretary, Alice Hughes (Joan Blondell), hears him sing and falls in love with him. She sets up an audition for Dick to sing for the sponsor, Mrs. Flaggenheim (Louise Fazenda). He's late for his audition and blows his big chance.

Convinced she must go to Italy to find a good enough singer, with enough "romance" to represent her fine cheese products, Mrs. Flaggenheim takes Alice with her to find one in Venice. Dick watches as Alice boards the ship and manages to get on board and work for his passage to Italy. When in Venice, he looks up his friend and mentor from New York City, professor de Vinci (Adolphe Menjou), who had gone ahead to use his old connections to help Dick's singing career. They manage to score a couple of jobs as gondoliers for an upcoming event.

Dick uses the opportunity to showcase his voice. Mrs. Flaggenheim hears him and wants to sign him to a contract immediately, thinking he's an authentic Italian named "Ricardo Purcelli". Alice recognizes him, but they continue to hide his true identity and they all go back to New York. However, his fellow taxi drivers recognize him as soon as he gets off the boat. Richards is appalled the moment he lays eyes on him, but Alice convinces him that “Ricardo”’ will get away with it. He instantly  becomes a radio sensation. Alice's jilted boyfriend figures out that Ricardo Purcelli is actually just Dick and gives him an ultimatum. Dick must decide if he wants to continue masquerading as Ricardo and finally attain the fame and fortune he'd always dreamed of....or give it all up for Alice, the one he loves. Dick keeps singing, because Alice wants him to. Too many people depend on him. One of the cabbies gives the story to the newspapers and rumors spread. Alice lies to Dick, letting him think that she would not marry him if he gave up the pretense.  Sick of being a phony, Dick reveals the truth on the air and walks out. The papers are full of the news. Thousands of fans write to say they love Dick's voice and don't care about the rest. Everyone is looking for  him, especially Alice, who wants to tell him that she'll live with him anywhere. De Vinci literally runs into Dick in the street when their cabs collide and rushes him to the studio in time for the broadcast of the Flaggenheim Cheese Hour with the Broadway Gondolier. Alice hears the broadcast and rushes to the studio and into his arms.

Cast 
 Dick Powell as Richard 'Dick' Purcell, aka Ricardo Purcelli
 Joan Blondell as Alice Hughes
 Adolphe Menjou as Professor Eduardo de Vinci
 Louise Fazenda as Mrs. Flaggenheim
 William Gargan as Cliff Stanley
 George Barbier as Music Critic Hayward
 Grant Mitchell as E. V. Richards, Radio Producer
 The Mills Brothers as themselves
 George Chandler as Photographer

Box office
According to Warner Bros records the film earned $795,000 domestically and $324,000 foreign.

References

External links 
 
 
 
 

1935 films
1935 musical films
Films directed by Lloyd Bacon
American black-and-white films
Warner Bros. films
Films produced by Samuel Bischoff
American musical films
1930s English-language films
1930s American films